Espace Group is a French media company established in 1987, based at Lyon and which engages in mainly radio publishing.

Between 1993 and 2009, the Espace Group was allowed to broadcast the Swiss radio station Couleur 3 in France, until all French frequencies were taken over completely by Virage Radio in June 2009.

Operations

Radio stations
Espace Group is currently owning and broadcasting the following stations:

 Alpes 1 (Grenoble, Gap) : since 1999
 Générations (Paris) : since 1992
 Jazz Radio (Lyon) : since 1996 (formerly Fréquence Jazz)
 Là la Radio (Briançon)
 La Radio Plus (Thonon-les-Bains) : since 1982 (formerly: Radio Thollon)
 M Radio (Lyon) : since 1981 (formerly: Radio Montmartre, Montmartre FM, MFM Radio)
 ODS Radio (Annecy) : since the 1980s
 Radio Espace (Lyon) : since 1995
 Radio RVA (Clermont-Ferrand) : since the 1990s
 Radio Sun (Lyon) : since 1993
 Virage Radio (Lyon) : since 2009 ; (before broadcasting: Couleur 3 between 1993 and 2009)

Other
 LyonMag.com : news and info website for the Lyon area.

References

External links

Radio broadcasting companies of France
Mass media companies established in 1987
Mass media in Lyon
Companies based in Lyon